Thomas of Strasburg (died 1357) was a fourteenth-century scholastic of the Augustinian Order. In 1347, two years after he became general, his second son died of the plague. In 1345, he became the general of his order, a position he would hold for the rest of his life. During his tenure, he would revise the constitution of his order.

References
 Catholic Encyclopedia article

Augustinian friars
Year of birth missing
1357 deaths